Perro may refer to:

 Perro (comics), a super villain in the Marvel Comics Universe
 Perro Aguayo (born 1946), Mexican wrestler
 Perro Aguayo, Jr. (born 1979), Mexican wrestler
 Planet Earth Rock and Roll Orchestra (album), an album by Paul Kantner
 Planet Earth Rock and Roll Orchestra, a nickname for various artists recording in the early 1970s
 Perro (spider), a genus of spiders

See also
 El perro, a 2004 film
 Dave Parro (born 1957), Canadian ice hockey goaltender
 Pero (disambiguation)
 Perri (disambiguation)
 Pirro (disambiguation)